Satana is a city and a municipal council in Nashik District in the Indian state of Maharashtra. It is in the taluka of Baglan, which is sometimes called Satana, because of the city's dominance in the taluka. The name "Satana" is derived from "Śāṭyāyani" one of the minor Upanishads of the Muktika canon.

Geography
It has an average elevation of 544 metres (1784 feet).

This tehsil includes historical forts like Tilwan, Pisol, Salher. Forest in Avati is famous in Nashik district.

Demographics
 India census, Satana had a population of 32,551. Males constitute 52% of the population and females 48%. Satana has an average literacy rate of 75%, higher than the national average of 59.5%: male literacy is 79%, and female literacy is 70%. In Satana, 12% of the population is under 6 years of age.

People from Satana
 
 Upasni Maharaj, born Kashinath Govindrao Upasni,[1] (5 May 1870 – 24 December 1941 [2]) was considered by his disciples to be a satguru.

References 

Cities and towns in Nashik district